Fairfield Presbyterian Church is a historic Presbyterian Church in America congregation in the Fairton section of Fairfield Township in Cumberland County, New Jersey.
It was founded in 1680 when a log church was built on the banks of the Cohansey Creek, and it is the oldest existing congregation currently within the PCA (which it joined in 1980 after leaving the UPCUSA in 1971). This log church was replaced by a New England style frame building sometime between 1713 and 1715.

In 1780, the Old Stone Church was built, which still exists a mile and half to the south of Fairton, and north of Cedarville, on County Route 553. The stone church was in use until 1850, when the present building in Fairton was completed. It was documented by the Historic American Buildings Survey in 1936. The Old Stone Church has been preserved and was added to the National Register of Historic Places on May 12, 1977, for its significance in architecture.

In 2006 the church celebrated its 325th anniversary.  The church subscribes to the Westminster Confession of Faith.  The current senior pastor is Rev. Michael Schuelke, who has served the congregation since 1992.

Pastors

M. Bradnor (1680-1695)	
Thomas Bridges (1695-1702)	
Joseph Smith (1709-1711)	
Samuel Exell (1712-1712)	
Howell A.P. Howell (1715-1717)	
Henry Hook (1718-1722)	
Noyes Parris (1724-1729)	
Daniel Elmer (1729-1755)	
William Ramsey (1756-1771)	
William Hollingshead (1773-1783)	
Ethan Osborn (1789-1844)	
David McKee (1836-1838)	
Beriah B. Hotchckin (1845-1850)	
David C. Meeker (1851-1855)	
James Boggs (1857-1866)	
Hiram E. Johnson (1866-1869)	
Samuel R. Jones (1869-1874)	
Samuel R. Anderson (1875-1883)	
Henry Reeves (1883-1885)	
Frank R. Symmes (1886-1890)	
Thomas W. Pulham (1891-1893)	
George Warrington (1894-1897)	
J.N. Wagenhurst (1897-1900)
John Bamford (1901-1903)
W.J. Trimble (1903-1906)
William Bullock (1907-1908)
Nelson B. Kline (1909-1910)
William M. Seel (1912-1914)
Franklin Weatherwax (1914-1917)
Nelson B. Kline (1918-1922)
Jacob Dyke (1922-1923)
J. Howard Douglas (1923-1928)
Clinton Cook (1929-1941)
Arthur Haverly (1942-1945)
John Taxis (1945-1947)
Paul Stauning (1947-1951)
Ralph Tamaccio (1951-1954)
Lincoln Griswold (1955-1958)
Allen Ackley (1960-1964)
Vaughn Thurman (1965-1967)
Charles Dennison (1972-1976)
Lawrence C. Roff (1977-1984)
Allan Story (1985-1992)
Michael Schuelke (1992–present)
Source:

Notes

See also
National Register of Historic Places listings in Cumberland County, New Jersey
Old Broad Street Presbyterian Church and Cemetery

References

Bibliography

External links

 

Presbyterian Church in America churches in New Jersey
Religious organizations established in 1680
Churches on the National Register of Historic Places in New Jersey
Georgian architecture in New Jersey
Churches completed in 1780
Churches in Cumberland County, New Jersey
Stone churches in New Jersey
National Register of Historic Places in Cumberland County, New Jersey
New Jersey Register of Historic Places
Historic American Buildings Survey in New Jersey
18th-century Presbyterian church buildings in the United States
1680 establishments in New Jersey
Fairfield Township, Cumberland County, New Jersey